Rhopalophora neivai is a species of beetle in the family Cerambycidae. It was described by Mendes in 1940.

References

neivai
Beetles described in 1940